The New Adventures of Gilligan is an American Saturday morning animated series produced by Filmation, which aired on ABC during the 1974–1975 seasons. The show was based on the 1964–1967 sitcom Gilligan's Island. A few years later, Filmation produced a sequel, Gilligan's Planet.

Premise 
The New Adventures of Gilligan was based on the 1964–1967 CBS television series Gilligan's Island and featured all of the characters from that show. Most of the original cast reprised their roles and provided their voices for the animated series, with the exception of Tina Louise and Dawn Wells. Louise wanted to distance herself from the role of Ginger Grant (consequently, the animated Ginger changed from a redhead to a platinum blonde in case Louise objected to Filmation using her image) and Wells was on the road in a play and unavailable. Actress Jane Webb provided the voice for both Ginger and Mary Ann, credited under her married name (Jane Edwards) for Mary Ann and her maiden name (Jane Webb) for Ginger.

The overall storyline of the animated series was basically the same as the original live-action show, and the plots of the individual episodes were similar to those of the original series. A first mate and his skipper set out on a three-hour tour with five passengers and end up stranded on an uncharted desert isle. The one change was the introduction of Stubby, an anthropomorphic monkey who is befriended by Gilligan.

Much like other Filmation series at the time, the stories were more aimed at children and often contained a moral lesson; many of the episodes concluded with an "educational tag" where Skipper and Gilligan would talk about whatever lesson they had learned that day. The show worked with an educational consultant, Dr. Nathan Cohen of UCLA, to supervise the educational content.

Cast 

 Bob Denver as Willy Gilligan 
 Alan Hale Jr. as Skipper Jonas Grumby
 Jim Backus as Thurston Howell III
 Natalie Schafer as Eunice Wentworth "Lovey" Howell
 Russell Johnson as Professor Roy Hinkley
 Jane Webb as Ginger Grant, Mary Ann Summers
 Lou Scheimer as Stubby (uncredited)

Production 
The series was produced by Filmation Associates, who first approached Sherwood Schwartz to license the show back in 1971 and then they tried again in 1972 and 1973. According to Filmation co-founder Lou Scheimer, Schwartz was in the middle of trying to revive the live-action series and declined to have the show adapted into a cartoon. By 1974, after failing to sell a Gilligan's Island revival to any of the networks, Schwartz agreed to license the show, on condition that he was allowed to have great creative input, including hands-on supervision of not only the scripts, but the storyboards as well.

Like the original series, The New Adventures of Gilligan contained an adult laugh track, which was common practice with most Saturday-morning cartoons of the era. One unique feature of Gilligan was the fact that it was produced and animated in the United States, where most shows at that time were animated overseas in order to cut production costs. However, Filmation's dedication to having its shows produced locally did not help the production values, as many felt the animation of Gilligan was of poor quality. As the series did not secure the rights to "The Ballad of Gilligan's Isle", a spoken-word poem with lyrics and backing music vaguely reminiscent of the theme (but distinct enough to avoid copyright issues) was substituted as the opening introduction. All of the voice actors except for Bob Denver read portions of the poem.

The show debuted on ABC Saturday morning on September 7, 1974. After 24 episodes over two seasons, ABC relegated the show to Sunday mornings for a third and final season of repeats in 1976–77. The network, still reeling from the ratings disaster in 1975–76 connected with Uncle Croc's Block, was reluctant to order another season of animated Gilligan installments or anything new from Filmation Associates.

In 1982, another Gilligan's Island-based animated series was created, this time entitled Gilligan's Planet. The premise for that series centered around the castaways creating a spaceship and winding up on a deserted planet.

The series is owned by Turner Entertainment Co. (under Warner Bros. Television), rather than Filmation successor Universal Television, due to the show being a part of the pre-1986 Metro-Goldwyn-Mayer library.

Episodes

Season 1 (1974)

Season 2 (1975)

Home media
The premiere episode of The New Adventures of Gilligan, "Off Limits", was released as part of Warner Home Video's Saturday Morning Cartoons – 1970s Volume 2 on October 27, 2009. The complete series was originally scheduled to be released on DVD in the spring of 2011, but was pushed back.

On April 26, 2016, The New Adventures of Gilligan: The Complete Series was released on DVD in region 1 as part of the Warner Archive Collection. This is a manufacture-on-demand release, available exclusively through Warner's online store.

The series is also available at the iTunes Store.

See also 

 List of animated spinoffs from prime time shows

References

External links 
 
 
 TVSeriesFinale.com article on last episode. Includes series opening and closing.

1970s American animated television series
1974 American television series debuts
1975 American television series endings
American Broadcasting Company original programming
American children's animated comedy television series
American animated television spin-offs
Gilligan's Island
English-language television shows
Television series created by Sherwood Schwartz
Television series by Filmation
Television series by Warner Bros. Television Studios